Mohan Lal Gupta is a Indian politician who was the first mayor of Jaipur and Former Member of the Legislative Assembly (MLA) of Rajasthan representing Kishanpole Constituency for three consecutive terms. He is a leader senior leader of Bharatiya Janata Party.
Social Worker
First Mayor of Jaipur, 
MLA from Kishanpole 
For Three times 
Ex-Chairman P.U.C Committee
Ex-Syndicate Member(UNIRAJ)

References
  rajassembly

Politicians from Jaipur
Rajasthani politicians
Rajasthan municipal councillors
Mayors of places in Rajasthan
1955 births
Living people
Rajasthan MLAs 2013–2018
University of Rajasthan alumni
Bharatiya Janata Party politicians from Rajasthan